The Micronesian myzomela (Myzomela rubratra) is a species of bird in the honeyeater family Meliphagidae. The species forms a superspecies with a number of related and similar looking island and mainland myzomelas across the Pacific and Australasia. It in turn is composed of seven insular subspecies.

It is distributed throughout the Northern Mariana Islands, including Rota, Tinian and Saipan, as well as Yap, Chuuk, Pohnpei and Kosrae in Micronesia, and the islands of Palau. The species once also occurred in Guam, but that population is now almost certainly extinct.

Across its wide distribution, the Micronesian myzomela occupies a range of natural and man-made habitats, from sea level to the highest peaks, although the lack of mountains in Micronesia predominantly makes this a species of the lowlands. Forests, mangroves, scrubland, secondary scrub, savanna, as well as agricultural, plantation and urban areas, are all used by this species.

The Micronesian myzomela primarily feeds on nectar, but will also take insects and other small invertebrates. One study estimated that the ratio of nectar to insects was 60:40. They occur singly and in pairs, while occasionally small groups will gather at good sources of nectar. They are territorial and aggressive at defending their territories from other members of the same species, and from other species such as bridled white-eyes. The species is an important pollinator within its range; after its extinction on Guam, the island was left without pollinators, with resulting adverse effects on the ecosystem.

References

Micronesian myzomela
Birds of Micronesia
Micronesian myzomela
Taxonomy articles created by Polbot